Vampire Hunter D 2 may refer to:

 Vampire Hunter D: Raiser of Gales, the second novel
 Vampire Hunter D: Bloodlust, the second film
 Hideyuki Kikuchi's Vampire Hunter D Volume 2 (manga), the second manga volume